Parting traditions or parting customs are various traditions, customs, and habits used by people to acknowledge the parting of individuals or groups of people from each other.

Parting traditions are highly culture-, situation- and interpersonal specific and may change within a culture depending on social status and personal relationship. 

Parting traditions include parting phrases, parting gestures, as well as parting ceremonies and rituals of various degree of complexity.

Some phrases and gestures may be used both for greeting and for parting.

Gestures
Bowing   
Cheek kissing
Handshake
Namaste

See also
 Greeting
 Salutation

References